Xuezhiyuan station is a subway station on the Changping line of the Beijing Subway. It opened on 4 February 2023.

History 
The project name of the station is Xueqinglu station (学清路站). On July 19, 2021, in the naming plan for the stations on the southern section of the Changping Line announced by the Beijing Municipal Commission of Planning and Natural Resources, the station was renamed to Xueqing station (学清站). In June 2022, the station was officially named Xuezhiyuan station.

Layout
The station has an underground island platform. There are 3 exits, lettered B, C and D. Exit B is accessible via an elevator. Exit A is under construction.

Station Art
There is a mural named 'Youth Campus' in the paid area of ​​the station hall, showing the scenes of university life such as libraries, basketball courts, self-study rooms, dormitories, and laboratories.

Gallery

References 

Beijing Subway stations in Haidian District